Majken Christiansen (born 14 September 1967) is a Danish jazz vocalist, known from several releases and jazz standard performances.

Biography 
Christiansen was born in Copenhagen, Denmark. She led the band Fjeldtetten, including Per Rick, Ebbe Lundgaard, Peter Reimer and Mogens Kann Fjelsøe, releasing several albums from 1992 onwards.
After moving to Oslo she released Songs For My Father (2001), dedicated to her father, and Re:porter live at Herr Nilsen (2003) with Anders Aarum, Georg Michael Reiss, Jens Fossum and her husband Torstein Ellingsen, both on Hot Club Records.

She also led the band Swing Society with Tore Sandnæs, Torstein Ellingsen, and Stig Hvalryg, also touring for Rikskonsertene in a show called «Ella Fitzgerald, the first lady of song». Her current Norwegian quintet comprises Frode Kjekstad, Ove Alexander Billington, Stig Hvalryg, and Torstein Ellingsen. 
Besides, she has played with varied bands, like Magnolia Jazzband, Sandvika Storband, Bodil Niska, David Arthur Skinner, Christiania 12,  Det Norske Blåseensemble (with a Duke Ellington show) and Ski Storband.

Discography

Solo albums 
 Majken
 2001: Song For My Father (Hot Club Records)
 2003: Re:porter (Hot Club Records)
 2007: Comes Love (Park Grammofon)
 2011: Speak Love (MJB Records)

Collaborations 
 with Fjeldtetten
 1993: A Tribute To Ella (Fjeldmus)	
 1996: On The Sunny Side, 5 År Med Majken & Fjeltetten - Her Danish Jazzdaddies (Fjeldmus)
 1998: Pa Viften (Fjeldmus)		
	
 with Ski Storband, feat. Majken Christiansen and Frode Kjekstad
 2009: Ski Loves You... Madly! (Ski Storband)

References

External links 
 

1967 births
Living people
Danish jazz singers
Norwegian women jazz singers
Norwegian jazz singers
Musicians from Copenhagen
ACT Music artists
Hot Club Records artists